= Edith V. Garcia =

Wyoming politician

Member of the Wyoming House of Representatives from the Laramie district

Edith V. Garcia is an American Democratic politician from Cheyenne, Wyoming. She represented the Laramie district in the Wyoming House of Representatives from 1991 to 1992.
